This is a list of events held and scheduled by the ONE Championship (ONE), a mixed martial arts promotion based in Singapore. ONE's inaugural event, ONE FC 1: Champion vs. Champion, took place on September 3, 2011. Each ONE event contains several fights.

Scheduled events

Category: -  2011 in ONE Championship  -  2012 in ONE Championship  -  2013 in ONE Championship  -  2014 in ONE Championship  -  2015 in ONE Championship  -  2016 in ONE Championship  -  2017 in ONE Championship  -  2018 in ONE Championship  -  2019 in ONE Championship  -  2020 in ONE Championship - 2021 in ONE Championship - 2022 in ONE Championship - 2023 in ONE Championship  (upcoming)

Past events

Number of events by year

Event locations
The following cities have hosted a total of 234 ONE Championship, Road to ONE and ONE Friday Fights events as of ONE Friday Fights 9: Eersel vs. Sinsamut 2.

 Singapore (78)
Kallang (75)
Jurong (3)

  Thailand (31)
Bangkok (31)

 China (27)
Beijing (17)
Shanghai (4)
Guangzhou (2)
Macau SAR (2)
Anhui (1)
Changsha (1)

 Philippines (22)
Pasay (21)
Quezon City (1)

 Malaysia (18)
Kuala Lumpur (18)

 Indonesia (16)
Jakarta (16)

 Myanmar (9)
Yangon (9)

 United States (8)
Phoenix, Arizona (6)
Glendale, Arizona (2)

 Japan (6)
Tokyo (6)

 England (4)
London (2)
Liverpool (1)
Sheffield (1)

 Cambodia (2)
Phnom Penh (2)

 Armenia (1)
Yerevan (1)

 Australia (1)
Gladstone, Queensland (1)

 Czech Republic (1)
Prague (1)

 Germany (1)
Riesa (1)

 Mongolia (1)
Ulaanbaatar (1)

 Netherlands (1)
Utrecht (1)

 Russia (1)
Yekaterinburg (1)

 Serbia (1)
Belgrade (1)

 Spain (1)
Tenerife (1)

 Taiwan (1)
Taipei (1)

 Turkey (1)
Istanbul (1)

 United Arab Emirates (1)
Abu Dhabi (1)

 Vietnam (1)
Ho Chi Minh City (1)

References

ONE Championship events
2011 in mixed martial arts
2012 in mixed martial arts
2013 in mixed martial arts
2014 in mixed martial arts
2015 in mixed martial arts
2016 in mixed martial arts
2017 in mixed martial arts
2018 in mixed martial arts
2019 in mixed martial arts
2020 in mixed martial arts
2021 in mixed martial arts
2022 in mixed martial arts
ONE Championship